Sandrine Niyonkuru (born 1 January 2000) is a Burundian footballer who plays as a forward for Tanzanian club Fountaingate Schools and the Burundi women's national team.

References

External links 
 

2000 births
Living people
Burundian women's footballers
Women's association football forwards
Burundi women's international footballers
Burundian expatriate footballers
Burundian expatriate sportspeople in Tanzania
Expatriate women's footballers in Tanzania